1234567890 (a string
containing each digit of the Arabic numerals) may represent:
 An example of a pandigital number
 A moment in Unix time celebrated in 2009
 The number 1 billion 234 million 567 thousand 890

See also 
 Numeral system, any writing system for expressing numbers
 QWERTY, keyboard layout